The 2005–06 Grand Prix of Figure Skating Final was an elite figure skating competition held at the Yoyogi National Gymnasium in Tokyo, Japan from December 16 to 18, 2005. Medals were awarded in men's singles, ladies' singles, pair skating, and ice dancing.

The Grand Prix Final was the culminating event of the ISU Grand Prix of Figure Skating series, which consisted of Skate America, Skate Canada International, Cup of China, Trophée Éric Bompard, Cup of Russia, and NHK Trophy competitions. The top six skaters from each discipline competed in the final.

Results

Men

Ladies

Pairs

Ice dancing

External links
 

2005 in figure skating
Grand Prix of Figure Skating Final
Grand Prix of Figure Skating Final